Clark Street Congregational Church, in Morecambe, Lancashire, England, was built in 1863 and designed by the Lancaster architect E. G. Paley.  It provided seating for 350 people.  The chapel has a northwest tower, a southwest porch, and windows containing plate tracery.  The church closed before 1980, and has been converted into offices.

See also

List of ecclesiastical works by E. G. Paley

References

Churches completed in 1863
Church buildings by E. G. Paley
Former churches in Lancashire
Churches in the City of Lancaster
Congregational churches in Lancashire
Clark Street